Kasalanan Bang Ibigin Ka? (International title: Forbidden Love / ) is a 2012 Philippine television drama romance series broadcast by GMA Network. Directed by Mark A. Reyes, it stars Jackie Rice and Geoff Eigenmann. It premiered on June 4, 2012 on the network's Afternoon Prime line up replacing The Good Daughter. The series concluded on August 31, 2012 with a total of 64 episodes. It was replaced by Sana ay Ikaw na Nga in its timeslot.

Cast and characters

Lead cast
 Jackie Rice as Erica Santiago-Montelibano
 Geoff Eigenmann as Jake / Joaquin Montelibano

Supporting cast
 Jennica Garcia as Bianca Santiago
 Michael de Mesa as Jaime Montelibano
 Angelika Dela Cruz as Leslie Montelibano
 Bubbles Paraiso as Janice
 Bobby Andrews as Neil
 Sharmaine Arnaiz as Beatrice Montelibano
 Pancho Magno as Tristan
 Diego Castro as Vitto
 Rox Montealegre as Karen
 Baby O'Brien as Malou
 Michael Flores as Sebastian

Guest cast
 Jackie Lou Blanco as Lalaine Santiago
 Ricardo Cepeda as Miguel Santiago
 Dang Cruz as Bing
 Vangie Labalan as Clara
 Nathalie Hart as Carissa

Ratings
According to AGB Nielsen Philippines' Mega Manila household television ratings, the pilot episode of Kasalanan Bang Ibigin Ka earned a 16.6% rating. While the final episode scored a 19.5% rating.

Accolades

References

External links
 

2012 Philippine television series debuts
2012 Philippine television series endings
Filipino-language television shows
GMA Network drama series
Philippine romance television series
Television shows set in Manila